The 207th Division was created in January 1949 under the Regulation of the Redesignations of All Organizations and Units of the Army, issued by Central Military Commission on November 1, 1948,basing on the 21st Brigade, 7th Column of Huabei Military Region, formed in November 1947. Under the command of 69th Corps it took part in battles during the Chinese civil war.

The division was then composed of:
619th Infantry Regiment;
620th Infantry Regiment;
621st Infantry Regiment.

Shortly after its activation, in March 1949 the division was disbanded along with the 69th Corps. Its personnel were absorbed into 205th and 206th divisions.

References

Infantry divisions of the People's Liberation Army
Military units and formations established in 1949
Military units and formations disestablished in 1949